The 1948 Ontario general election was held on June 7, 1948, to elect the 90 members of the 23rd Legislative Assembly of Ontario (Members of Provincial Parliament, or "MPPs") of the Province of Ontario.

The Ontario Progressive Conservative Party, led by George Drew, won a third consecutive term in office, winning a solid majority of seats in the legislature—53, down from 66 in the previous election.

Despite winning a majority, Drew lost his own seat to temperance crusader Bill Temple. Instead of seeking a seat in a by-election, Drew left provincial politics to run for, and win, the leadership of the federal Progressive Conservative Party.

Drew was replaced as Ontario PC leader and premier by Thomas Kennedy on an interim basis, and then by Leslie Frost.

The Ontario Liberal Party, led by Farquhar Oliver, increased its caucus from 11 to 14, but lost the role of official opposition. Only one of the three Liberal-Labour MPPs sitting with the Liberal caucus, James Newman, was re-elected.

The social democratic Co-operative Commonwealth Federation (Ontario Section), led by Ted Jolliffe, formed the official opposition by increasing its caucus from 8 to 21 seats.

Two Toronto seats were won by Labor-Progressive Party MPPs J. B. Salsberg and A.A. MacLeod. The LPP was the official name of the  Communist Party of Ontario. The LPP only ran two candidates, Salsberg and MacLeod, in 1948 down from 31 candidates in 1945.

Results

|-
! colspan=2 rowspan=2 | Political party
! rowspan=2 | Party leader
! colspan=5 | MPPs
! colspan=3 | Votes
|-
! Candidates
!1945
!Dissol.
!1948
!±
!#
!%
! ± (pp)

|style="text-align:left;"|George Drew
|90
|66
|66
|53
|13
|725,799
|41.28%
|2.97

|style="text-align:left;"|Ted Jolliffe
|81
|8
|8
|21
|13
|466,274
|26.52%
|4.11

|style="text-align:left;"|Farquhar Oliver
|88
|11
|11
|13
|2
|515,795
|29.34%
|2.44

|style="text-align:left;"|A.A. MacLeod
|2
|2
|2
|2
|
|17,654
|1.00%
|1.44

|style="text-align:left;"|
|2
|3
|3
|1
|2
|7,682
|0.44%
|1.89

|style="text-align:left;"|Ron Gostick
|12
|–
|–
|–
|
|8,844
|0.50%
|

|style="text-align:left;"|
|1
|–
|–
|–
|
|8,613
|0.49%
|

|style="text-align:left;"|
|3
|–
|–
|–
|
|3,340
|0.19%
|

|style="text-align:left;"|
|1
|–
|–
|–
|
|1,766
|0.10%
|0.56

|style="text-align:left;"|
|3
|–
|–
|–
|
|1,104
|0.06%
|0.05

|style="text-align:left;"|Socialist-Labour
|style="text-align:left;"|
|5
|–
|–
|–
|
|913
|0.05%
|0.01

|
|1
|–
|–
|–
|
|253
|0.01%
|0.35

|style="text-align:left;"|
|–
|–
|–
|–
|
|colspan="3"|Did not campaign

|colspan="3"|
|
|colspan="5"|
|-style="background:#E9E9E9;"
|colspan="3" style="text-align:left;"|Total
|289
|90
|90
|90
|
|1,758,037
|100.00%
|
|-
|colspan="8" style="text-align:left;"|Blank and invalid ballots
|align="right"|16,935
|style="background:#E9E9E9;" colspan="2"|
|-style="background:#E9E9E9;"
|colspan="8" style="text-align:left;"|Registered voters / turnout
|2,623,281
|67.66%
|5.12
|}

Seats that changed hands

There were 34 seats that changed allegiance in the election.

 PC to CCF
Beaches
Bracondale
Dovercourt
Hamilton Centre
Hamilton East
High Park
Ontario
Parkdale
Riverdale
St. David
Waterloo South
Woodbine
York East
York South
York West

 PC to Liberal
Brantford
Bruce
Kent East
London
Niagara Falls
Prince Edward—Lennox
Welland

 CCF to PC
Kenora
Sudbury

 CCF to Liberal
Fort William

 Liberal to PC
Cochrane North
Glengarry
Nipissing
Parry Sound
Prescott
Russell
Stormont

 Liberal-Labour to CCF
Essex North

 Liberal-Labour to Liberal
Waterloo North

See also
Politics of Ontario
List of Ontario political parties
Premier of Ontario
Leader of the Opposition (Ontario)

References

1948 elections in Canada
1948
General election
June 1948 events in North America